Los Penitentes may refer to:
Los Penitentes (Argentina), ski resort
Penitentes (New Mexico), religious organization

See also 
 Penitente (disambiguation)